Timaima Tamoi (born 30 November 1987) is a Fijian rugby sevens player. She was a member of the Fiji women's national rugby sevens team at the 2016 Summer Olympics. She was part of the team that featured at the 2015 Canada Women's Sevens.

References

External links

 

Rugby sevens players at the 2016 Summer Olympics
Olympic rugby sevens players of Fiji
Fiji international rugby sevens players
Fijian female rugby union players
1987 births
Living people
Fiji international women's rugby sevens players